Monodontides is a genus of butterflies in the family Lycaenidae. The species of this genus are found in the Indomalayan realm and the bordering Palearctic realm.

Species
Subgenus Buakraengius Eliot and Kawazoé, 1983
Monodontides cara (de Nicéville, 1898)
Subgenus Monodontides Toxopeus, 1927
Monodontides apona (Fruhstorfer, 1910)
Monodontides argioloides (Rothschild, 1915)
Monodontides chapmani Cassidy, 2003
Monodontides hondai Eliot and Kawazoé, 1983
Monodontides kolari (Ribbe, 1926)
Monodontides luzonensis Eliot and Kawazoé, 1983
Monodontides musina (Snellen, 1892)
Monodontides ternatensis Eliot and Kawazoé, 1983

References

Further reading
D'Abrera, B., 1978. Butterflies of the Australian Region, edn 2. 415 pp. Melbourne.
Eliot, J. N. and Kawazoe, A., 1983. Blue butterflies of the Lycaenopsis group: 1-309, 6 pls. London
Toxopeus, 1927b-1928: Eine Revision der javanischen, zu Lycaenopsis und verwandten Genera gehörigen Arten. Tijdschrift voor Entomologie 70: 232-302, 1pl., 27 figs; Tijdschrift voor Entomologie 71: 179-265, 1 pl., 29 figs.

 
Lycaenidae genera
Taxa named by Lambertus Johannes Toxopeus